"Love Is a Sometimes Thing" is a song written by Jan Howard. It was first recorded by American country singer-songwriter Bill Anderson. It was released as a single in 1970 via Decca Records and became a major hit the same year.

Background and release
"Love Is a Sometimes Thing" was recorded on October 21, 1969, at the Bradley Studio, located in Nashville, Tennessee. The sessions were produced by Owen Bradley, who would serve as Anderson's producer through most of years with Decca Records. Two additional tracks were recorded during the same recording session: "Not Really Living at All" and "I Don't Have Any Place to Go." The song's composer, Jan Howard, was a frequent musical collaborator of Anderson's. Together, they co-wrote Connie Smith's 1970 hit "I Never Once Stopped Loving You." The pair also recorded several duets together, including the number one hit "For Loving You."

"Love Is a Sometimes Thing" was released as a single by Decca Records in January 1970. Anderson's backing band, The Po' Boys, received equal billing on the single's release. The song spent 15 weeks on the Billboard Hot Country Singles before reaching number five in May 1970. In Canada, the single reached number 10 on the RPM Country Songs chart. It was later released on his 1970 studio album, also called Love Is a Sometimes Thing.

Track listings
7" vinyl single
 "Love Is a Sometimes Thing" – 3:01
 "And I'm Still Missing You" – 2:23

Chart performance

References

1970 singles
1970 songs
Bill Anderson (singer) songs
Decca Records singles
Song recordings produced by Owen Bradley
Songs written by Jan Howard